Holmes Block is a blocklike bluff, rising to  at the west side of Ruecroft Glacier,  west of Cooke Bluff, in Victoria Land, Antarctica. It was named by the Advisory Committee on Antarctic Names in 1994 after John W. Holmes, a cartographer specialising in Antarctic mapping with the United States Geological Survey (USGS) Branch of Special Maps, 1951–77, and from 1977, assigned to the USGS Mapping Applications Center.

References

Cliffs of Victoria Land
Scott Coast